Asahinagu is a 2017 Japanese film based around the martial art of the naginata and fencing. It was directed by Tsutomu Hanabusa and is based on the sports/slice of life manga also called Asahinagu by Ai Kozaki.

Plot 
The film centres around Tojima Asahi, and her adventures  in her first year of high school. Tojima is a first-grade high school student. She is small and weak physically. Determined to change herself, she enrolls in the school's Naginata  Club. Asahi is also inspired to join the club due to their strongest member, Miyaji Maharu, who also helped her to hit a pervert flashing at Asahi.  Asahi discovers the group to be run by Sensei Kobayashi, a somewhat stupid teacher and the "ATM" or "wallet" of the team, but the team nevertheless is made up of somewhat competent and motivated members. The team are initially less than confident in her abilities due to her petite size, but are very encouraging. While discovering the training to be gruelling, Asahi is inspired by the other members. On their first training camp at a temple, the meet the hardened shinto priestess, Jukei who while pushing them through gruelling training, also inspires them and teaches them some winning techniques. Along the way, Asahi also develops a romance with Miyaji's brother, Miyaji Natsuyuki. The team develop a rivalry with another school team. Following a loss to rival Ichido, Miyaji drops out of the team. Asahi persists in encouraging her, until she rejoins the team. The team then works hard together for the national competition.

Cast 
 Asahi Tōjima played by Nanase Nishino
 Maharu Miyaji played by Mai Shiraishi
 Shōko Yasomura played by Reika Sakurai
 Sakura Konno played by Sayuri Matsumura
 Nene Ichidō played by Erika Ikuta
 Sensei Kobayashi played by Tomoya Nakamura
 Jyukei played by Noriko Eguchi
 Eri Nogami played by Marika Itō

References

External links 
  
 

2017 films
2017 martial arts films
2010s Japanese films
2010s action comedy-drama films
2010s sports comedy-drama films
2010s teen comedy-drama films
Asahinagu
Films directed by Tsutomu Hanabusa
Japanese action comedy-drama films
Japanese martial arts films
Japanese sports comedy-drama films
Toho films
Universal Pictures films
2017 comedy films
2017 drama films